Rickettsia peacockii is a species of gram negative Alphaproteobacteria of the spotted fever group, identified from Rocky Mountain wood ticks (Dermacentor andersoni). Its type strain is SkalkahoT. The organism is passed transstadially and transovarially, and infections are localized in ovarial tissues.

References

Further reading
 
 
 

Zoonoses
Rickettsiaceae
Bacteria described in 1997